The 2018 Metro Atlantic Athletic Conference baseball tournament was held from May 23 through 26. The top six regular season finishers of the league's eleven teams met in the double-elimination tournament, which was at Richmond County Bank Ballpark in Staten Island, New York. As tournament champion, Canisius earned the conference's automatic bid to the 2018 NCAA Division I baseball tournament.

Seeding
The top six teams were seeded one through six based on their conference winning percentage. They then played a double-elimination tournament.

Results

References

Tournament
Metro Atlantic Athletic Conference Baseball Tournament
Metro Atlantic Athletic Conference baseball tournament